Diatribe is the debut studio album of Diatribe, released on November 3, 1996 by Cargo and Re-Constriction Records.

Reception
Aiding & Abetting called Diatribe "a solid effort that connects on every level" and that "the power is palpable in every track." Sonic Boom gave Diatribe a positive review, saying the "album has the potential, if marketed right, to blow the lid off the entire crossover industrial scene. All of the elements are present; ballads, club tracks, industrial rock staples, and a lyricist who can sound like Sting one minute and Daniel Ash the next." Scott Hefflon of Lollipop Magazine agreed, saying "combining the singable vocal lines of typical rock music with the fat guitars of metal and the flexibility of looping percussion, surreal sound slicing, and slick keyboards, Diatribe offers a fresh, accessible variation of rock, without losing sight of the fact that they are, first and foremost, an electronics-based band." Option described the album as a "harsh, yet accessible mesh of guitars, complex electronics, organic & programmed percussion, with Marc J.'s indelible vocals."

Track listing

Personnel
Adapted from the Diatribe liner notes.

Diatribe
 Phil Biagini – electric guitar
 Marc Jameson – lead vocals, keyboards, drums, programming, production, engineering
 Kevin Marburg – bass guitar, sampler, cover art, design
 Pat Toves – electric guitar

Production and design
 Mike Bogus – engineering
 Jacqueline Gallier – additional vocals (3)
 Scott Gorham – mastering
 Daniel Jameson – engineering (6)
 Josquin des Pres – mastering

Release history

References

External links 
 

1996 debut albums
Diatribe (band) albums
Cargo Music albums
Re-Constriction Records albums